Ernest Kador Jr. (February 22, 1933 – July 5, 2001), known by the stage name Ernie K-Doe, was an American rhythm-and-blues singer best known for his 1961 hit single "Mother-in-Law", which went to number 1 on the Billboard pop chart in the U.S.

Early career
Born in New Orleans, K-Doe recorded as a member of the group the Blue Diamonds in 1954 before making his first solo recordings the following year. "Mother-in-Law", written by Allen Toussaint, was his first hit, reaching number 1 on both the Billboard pop chart and the Billboard R&B chart. K-Doe never had another top-40 pop hit, but "Te-Ta-Te-Ta-Ta" (number 21, 1961) and "Later for Tomorrow" (number 37, 1967) reached the R&B top 40.

Later career
In the 1980s, K-Doe did radio shows on the New Orleans community stations WWOZ and WTUL. The shows were known for his explosively energetic announcements and frequent self-promotion (occasionally causing problems for the noncommercial station). K-Doe's catch phrases included "Burn, K-Doe, Burn!", "I'm a Charity Hospital Baby!" and (addressed to himself) "You just good, that's all!" For a time he billed himself as "Mister Naugahyde", until he was ordered to desist by the owners of the Naugahyde trademark. K-Doe then explained that it was a misunderstanding; he was actually referring to himself as "Mister M-Nauga-Ma-Hyde", a word he invented himself.

In the 1990s, K-Doe began billing himself as "The Emperor of the Universe" and, wearing a cape and crown, became a famous local eccentric in New Orleans. He continued performing and occasionally recording until shortly before his death. Always an elaborate showman, one of K-Doe's most notable later performances was at the Aquarium of the Americas, in New Orleans, where he performed at a benefit for a local group aiding people with disabilities. The show ended with K-Doe performing seven continuous renditions of "Mother In Law" while dancing in front of the Gulf of Mexico shark tank exhibit dressed in a green plumed cape.

Later recordings of note include "White Boy, Black Boy". While best known as a singer, he was also an accomplished drummer.  The song "Here Come the Girls" was released in 1970 in the UK, but was not a hit. It was re-released in 2007 as a result of its use in an advertising campaign for Boots stores and reached number 43. A cover by the Sugababes reached number 3 on the UK charts in 2008.

Death
K-Doe died in 2001 of kidney and liver failure from years of alcoholism. After a traditional jazz funeral, he was interred in the 200-year-old Duval tomb in Saint Louis Cemetery number 2, in his native New Orleans. He had burial space in his father's family cemetery in Erwinville, Louisiana, but his widow, Antoinette, as well as his fans and friends in New Orleans, wanted his remains in the city, so the Duval family offered him some of their burial space. He is buried in the same tomb with his second mother-in-law, with whom he was very close, and his best friend, Earl King.

After death
His widow, Antoinette K-Doe, continued to operate his music club and bar, Ernie K-Doe's Mother-in-Law Lounge, which housed a life-size statue of him. The club was severely damaged by Hurricane Katrina in late 2005 and had to shut down. With the help of the Hands on Network and the musical artist Usher Raymond, Antoinette reopened the Mother-in-Law Lounge on August 28, 2006, in its original location at 1500 N. Claiborne Avenue.

Antoinette also led a tongue-in-cheek campaign for K-Doe's election for mayor of hurricane-ravaged New Orleans in 2006, five years after his death. She is quoted as saying, "He's the only one qualified—that's my opinion." Although K-Doe's name did not appear on the ballot, the campaign generated revenue from sales of T-shirts and bumper stickers. Antoinette used the proceeds from these sales for rebuilding the Mother-in-Law Lounge and helping the New Orleans Musicians' Clinic, both of which were damaged by Hurricane Katrina.

In November 2007 the British-based high street beauty store and pharmacy Boots used his 1970 performance of the song "Here Come the Girls" as the soundtrack of a Christmas TV commercial. This led to the re-release of the song as single in the UK in December 2007. A new Boots commercial, with a summer theme, featuring the song was aired between June and August 2008 .
The same song was also sampled on the Sugababes' single "Girls", which was then itself used in another Boots commercial in November 2008.

Antoinette died in New Orleans on February 24, 2009, Mardi Gras day, after a heart attack.

Ernie K-Doe was inducted into the Louisiana Music Hall of Fame in 2009.

Personal life 
Kador was Catholic.

Discography

References

Further reading

External links

 [ Biography on Allmusic]

American rhythm and blues musicians
American rhythm and blues singers
American male pop singers
Rhythm and blues musicians from New Orleans
American radio personalities
Duke Records artists
Minit Records artists
1933 births
2001 deaths
Deaths from cirrhosis
Alcohol-related deaths in Louisiana
Singers from Louisiana
African-American Catholics
20th-century African-American male singers